Song Jinghua (Chinese: 宋京華; 1979 – May 27, 2011) was a Chinese serial killer who killed and dismembered nine women in Beijing between 2005 and 2007. He was subsequently executed for his crimes in 2011.

Biography

1996 murder 
Song was born in 1979 in Inner Mongolia, and lived with his father and older brother. Little is known about Song's early years, but it can be assumed that his brother played a role in his future criminality, because in 1996 Song along with his brother agreed to rob and kill a taxi driver that had failed to pay the pair protection money just outside Gongti. 

The day after the crime took place, both Song and his brother were arrested with no explanation, but Song noticed his brother's ex girlfriend testifying on part of the prosecution as a witness at trial, making him believe she turned them in. His brother was sentenced to death and subsequently executed months later, while Song then 17-years-old, was given an eight year prison term. After six years, Song was granted early release in 2002, and was released.

Murders (2005–2007) 
Upon his release, Song had formed a mental agreement to exact revenge on his brother's ex, but could not locate her. Who he did locate was Yan Jinguang, who would later assist him in the murders. His murder spree began in 2005. Later, according to his own word, he killed women that shared a similarity with the ex, luring them in his car where he and Yan would strangle and steal money from the women. To help with the murders, the pair rented a living center in the Pinggu District to dismember the bodies. The victims ranged in age of 16 and 28. 
 
In 2007, Song killed his neighbor, upon fearing she was on to them after spotting allegedly him concealing a human head. At the crime scene, Song left a cigarette, ultimately leading to his arrest. According to himself, he left it there intentionally because he knew he was not going to stop. In his confession, he explained the whole story, claiming that the women whom he slain were the result of his anger towards his brother’s ex. Yan to was soon arrested, and after their convictions, they were both given corresponding execution dates. On May 27, 2011 both were executed.

See also 
 List of serial killers by country
 List of serial killers by number of victims

References

External links 
 未成年杀人犯出狱后残杀9名年轻女性，自称欲罢不能
 杀人成瘾的“变态”宋京华：哥哥死后仇视前女友，杀人夺命只因长相相似

1979 births
2011 deaths
20th-century Chinese criminals
21st-century Chinese criminals
Chinese male criminals
Chinese murderers of children
Chinese people convicted of murder
Executed Chinese serial killers
Male serial killers
People convicted of murder by China
People executed by China by firearm
People from Inner Mongolia
Violence against women in China